Vichai or Wichai is a Thai masculine given name meaning "victory". It is derived from the Pali/Sanskrit word  (विजय), and is cognate with the Indian name Vijay.

People with the name include:

 Vichai Limcharoen, boxer
 Vichai Rachanon, boxer
 Vichai Sanghamkichakul, footballer
 Vichai Srivaddhanaprabha, billionaire businessman

See also
 Vichai (king), ruler of the Kingdom of Lan Xang, 1637–1638

References

Thai masculine given names